Sergei Kosorotov may refer to:
 Sergei Kosorotov (judoka)
 Sergei Kosorotov (handballer)